Caftan d'Amour (Constellé de passion) (English: Caftan of Love or The Big Mirror) is a 1987 Moroccan film directed by Moumen Smihi.

Synopsis 
Khalil, a young bachelor who tends to his family's farm on the outskirts of the city, is looking for his soulmate. He sees her in his dream: a young woman of exceptional beauty. He decides to marry her. By chance, the next day, in the alleys of the medina, he meets this girl, Rachida. In addition to her exceptional beauty, she has an exceptional behavior and by marrying her. Rachida, once a dream, quickly becomes a nightmare.

Cast 

 Natalie Roche
 Mohamed Mehdi
 Nezha Regragui
 Larbi Doghmi
 Isabelle Weingarten

External links

References 

1987 films
Moroccan drama films